Dharmaraja Vidyalaya is one of the oldest schools in the Homagama Education Zone in Sri Lanka. It is a mixed school. It is situated near Meegoda town. At present there are about 1100 students in the school.but this is very different from the Dharmaraja College in Kandy.

Provincial schools in Sri Lanka
Schools in Colombo District